Ernest Hamilton can refer to:

 Lord Ernest Hamilton (1858–1939), soldier, MP and author
 Ernest Hamilton (lacrosse) (1883–1964), Canadian lacrosse player